Tamie Terice Shadle (formerly Grimes, ; born January 2, 1968) is a retired American soccer midfielder who was a member of the United States women's national soccer team. She also served as the head coach of San Jose State Spartans from 2000 to 2002 (the first season on an interim basis).

International career statistics

References

1968 births
Living people
American women's soccer players
Santa Clara Broncos women's soccer players
United States women's international soccer players
Women's association football midfielders
American women's soccer coaches
San Jose State Spartans women's soccer coaches